The 2012 Season was Palmeiras's 98th season, and their 97th in Brazil's first division. Palmeiras also played in the usual state league, Campeonato Paulista, the national cup, Copa do Brasil and the continental cup, the Copa Sudamericana.

Due to the renovations taking place at Palestra Itália, since 2010, for the construction of the new Arena, Palmeiras played all of their home matches in the 2012 season at the Pacaembu Stadium.

This season was the first one, in 20 years, without the services of Palmeiras' idol goalkeeper, Marcos, after he announced his retirement from football on 4 January 2012, at the age of 38.

Key events
11 July: Palmeiras won the Copa do Brasil, and enter on the group stage of 2013 Copa Libertadores.

13 September: The coach Scolari was sacked after losing streak in the Campeonato Brasileiro.

19 September: After negotiations with Paulo Roberto Falcão and Adilson Batista, Gilson Kleina was hired.

28 September: Palmeiras was dismissed by the Superior Court of Sports Justice (STJD) and punished with the loss of four home field matches, because of the confusion involving fans in the derby against Corinthians on 16 September.

18 November: After 10 years of relegation in Serie A, Palmeiras for the second time in his history will play in the second division of the Brazilian Championship.

29 November: Five players were dispensed after a bad campaign in 2012 season, they are: Leandro, João Vitor, Daniel Carvalho, Obina and Betinho. And other eleven players who still have links with the club, but were not utilized by the coach Gilson Kleina: Pegorari, Carlos, Fabinho Capixaba, Luís Felipe, Gerley, Leandro Amaro, Wellington, Tinga, Patrik, Daniel Lovinho and Tadeu.

3 December: Four more players were dispensed, following the redesign plan for 2013 season: Artur, Adalberto Román, Corrêa and Thiago Heleno.

Competitions

Friendlies
Palmeiras' first match in 2012 was a friendly at home against Ajax on 14 January.

Marcos last game
Marcos final game with Palmeiras shirt, will be a friendly between the 1999 Copa Libertadores champion team versus 2002 FIFA World Cup champion team.

Campeonato Paulista

First round

Quarterfinals

Source: Palmeiras.com.br (Portuguese)

Copa do Brasil

First round

Second round

Round of 16

Quarterfinals

Semifinals

Finals

Award

Campeonato Brasileiro

Standings

Results by round

Note 1: Palmeiras was punished with the loss of four home field matches.
Source: Palmeiras.com.br (Portuguese)

Copa Sudamericana

The draw will be held on 29 June 2012 (postponed from original date of 26 June), 12:00 UTC−04:00 at CONMEBOL's Convention Center in Luque, Paraguay.

Second round

Round of 16

Overall statistics

Players

Squad information

Source: Palmeiras.com.br

Note: Sixteen players were dispensed after the end of the season: Leandro, João Vitor, Daniel Carvalho, Obina, Betinho, Pegorari, Carlos, Fabinho Capixaba, Luís Felipe, Gerley, Leandro Amaro, Wellington, Tinga, Patrik, Daniel Lovinho and Tadeu.

Squad statistics

|}
NOTE: Starting appearance + Substitute appearance
Friendly matches not included

Transfers

In

Out

Scorers

Assists

Disciplinary record

Clean sheets

References

2012
Brazilian football clubs 2012 season